Kwadwo Kyeremeh Baah is a German professional footballer who plays as a forward for Fortuna Düsseldorf on loan from EFL Championship club Watford.

Early life
Baah was born in Germany to Ghanaian parents, but was raised in South Norwood.

Club career

Early career
In October 2016, aged 13, whilst Baah was at Crystal Palace, he caused controversy as a ball boy in a match against fellow London rivals West Ham United when he tried to stop the opponents time wasting by placing the ball in the six yard area for the goalkeeper Adrián. Baah was released by Crystal Palace at 14. He has credited that moment as a turning point in his development, admitting he didn't take many things seriously and knew he needed to change.

Baah played one game for Whyteleafe in August 2019, who were managed by Kinetic Academy founder Harry Hudson. He also had a trial with Fulham.

Rochdale

On 20 September 2019, at the age of 16, Baah signed to a scholarship contract at Rochdale. Baah made his first team league debut for Rochdale on 1 October, appearing as an 82nd minute substitute for Aaron Wilbraham in an EFL Trophy match at home to Bolton Wanderers.

He scored his first professional goal in a 5–0 win at Wigan Athletic on 15 December 2020. In February 2021, Baah was named EFL Young Player of the Month for January.

Watford
On 1 February 2021, Baah was close to signing a pre-contract agreement with Manchester City, however the deal collapsed. Having undergone a medical with Watford at the end of April and a fee of £125,000 agreed, he officially joined the club on 17 May ahead of their return to the Premier League.

Fortuna Düsseldorf (loan)
On 29 July 2022, Baah joined 2. Bundesliga club Fortuna Düsseldorf on loan for the 2022–23 season.

International career
On 29 March 2021, Baah made his debut for England U18s during a 2–0 win away to Wales at the Leckwith Stadium. He was also called up to take part in an England U19s training camp in May 2021 at St George's Park.

Baah was called up by Germany for the first time to represent their U19 side against Slovakia under-19's on 6 October 2021, followed by games against Portugal and the Netherlands youth squads.

Career statistics

References

2003 births
Living people
People from Horb am Neckar
Sportspeople from Karlsruhe (region)
Footballers from Baden-Württemberg
Association football forwards
English footballers
England youth international footballers
German footballers
English sportspeople of Ghanaian descent
German sportspeople of Ghanaian descent
German emigrants to England
Crystal Palace F.C. players
Whyteleafe F.C. players
Rochdale A.F.C. players
Watford F.C. players
Fortuna Düsseldorf players
Isthmian League players
English Football League players